Kenneth David West (born 1953) is the John D. MacArthur and Ragnar Frisch Professor of Economics in the Department of Economics at the University of Wisconsin. He is currently co-editor of the Journal of Money, Credit and Banking, and has previously served as co-editor of the American Economic Review. He has published widely in the fields of macroeconomics, finance, international economics and econometrics. Among his honors are the John M. Stauffer National Fellowship in Public Policy at the Hoover Institution, Alfred P. Sloan Research Fellowship, Fellow of the Econometric Society, and Abe Fellowship. He has been a research associate at the NBER since 1985.

West received a B.A. in economics and mthematics from Wesleyan University in 1973 and a Ph.D. from the Massachusetts Institute of Technology in 1983. He taught at Princeton University from 1983 to 1988 before joining the University of Wisconsin in 1988. He has held visiting scholar positions at several central banks and at several branches of the U.S. Federal Reserve System. He has published widely in the fields of macroeconomics, finance, international economics and econometrics. Administrative positions include two terms as chair of the Economics Department at the University of Wisconsin-Madison.

He is best known for developing, with Whitney K. Newey, the Newey–West estimator, which robustly estimates the covariance matrix of a regression model when errors are heteroskedastic and autocorrelated.

Personal life 

West lives in Madison, Wisconsin with his wife and two children.

Contributions

Newey–West estimator 
A Newey–West estimator is used in statistics and econometrics to provide an estimate of the covariance matrix of the parameters of a regression-type model when this model is applied in situations where the standard assumptions of regression analysis do not apply. It was devised by Whitney K. Newey and Kenneth D. West in 1987, although there are a number of later variants. The estimator is used to try to overcome autocorrelation (also called serial correlation), and heteroskedasticity in the error terms in the models, often for regressions applied to time series data.

Selected publications

References

External links 
 West's faculty page at the University of Wisconsin

21st-century American economists
Econometricians
Wesleyan University alumni
1953 births
Living people
University of Wisconsin–Madison faculty
Fellows of the Econometric Society